Pappammal (or Papammal, born 1914) is an Indian organic farmer from Tamil Nadu. At the age of 105, she is argued to be the oldest farmer still active in the field. She is regarded as a pioneer in the agriculture field and is affiliated with the Tamil Nadu Agricultural University's department of education. At her age, she works every day on her 2.5 acres land. The Government of India honored her in 2021, with the fourth highest civilian award of Padma Shri for her role in organic farming.

Personal life 
M. Pappammal alias Rangammal was born to Velammal and Maruthachala Mudaliar in the village of Devarayapuram in 1914. She lost her parents at a young age, and she and her two sisters were raised in Thekkampatti, Coimbatore by their paternal grandmother. She inherited the shop and opened an eatery. From the profits she made from these businesses, she bought nearly 10 acres of land in the village. She also brought up her sister's children.

She starts her day at 5:30 am and goes to her farm at 6 am, where she works till the afternoon. Her family members claimed that it's her food habits and active lifestyle that keeps her healthy. According to her family, her favorite food is mutton biryani, and she eats a lot of vegetables and greens with her food. She eats her food hot on a leaf and doesn't use any platters. She does not consume tea or coffee and drinks hot water.

Political life 
In the year 1959, she was an elected former ward member of the Thekkampatti Panchayat. She was also elected as a councillor in the Karamadai Panchayat Union. She is a member of the Dravida Munnetra Kazhagam (DMK) and an ardent fan of M. Karunanidhi.

References 

1914 births
Living people
Indian farmers
Indian women farmers
People from Tamil Nadu
Recipients of the Padma Shri